Ricardo Filipe Rodrigues Matos (born 15 February 1979) is a Portuguese retired footballer who played as a goalkeeper.

Career
Born in Santo Ildefonso (Porto), Matos competed in the Portuguese fourth division for the better part of his career, having two spells in the third: in the 1999–2000 season he played with Os Sandinenses, representing G.D. Ribeirão in 2008.

In the 2008–09 campaign, Matos was second-choice with Varzim S.C. in the second level. In the following summer, aged already 30, he signed for Primeira Liga side Vitória F.C. along with nine other players, despite the club's precarious financial situation.

Matos acted as backup in his first season in Setúbal, making his first official appearance on 8 May 2010 in a 1–2 home defeat against already relegated C.F. Os Belenenses. Vitória narrowly managed to avoid the drop.

References

External links

1979 births
Living people
Portuguese footballers
Association football goalkeepers
Primeira Liga players
Liga Portugal 2 players
Segunda Divisão players
G.D.R.C. Os Sandinenses players
G.D. Serzedelo players
F.C. Tirsense players
F.C. Famalicão players
G.D. Ribeirão players
Varzim S.C. players
Vitória F.C. players
Leixões S.C. players
FC Porto B players
Footballers from Porto